A mastoidectomy is a procedure performed to remove the mastoid air cells, air bubbles in the skull, near the inner ears. This can be done as part of treatment for mastoiditis, chronic suppurative otitis media or cholesteatoma. In addition, it is sometimes performed as part of other procedures (cochlear implant) or for access to the middle ear.
There are classically 5 different types of mastoidectomy:

 Radical
 Removal of posterior and superior canal wall, meatoplasty and exteriorisation of middle ear.
 Canal wall down
 Removal of posterior and superior canal wall, meatoplasty. Tympanic membrane left in place.
 Canal wall up
 Posterior and superior canal wall are kept intact. A facial recess approach is taken.
 Cortical
 (Also known as schwartze procedure) - Removal of Mastoid air cells is undertaken without affecting the middle ear. This is typically done for mastoiditis
 Modified radical
 This is confusing because it is typically described as a radical mastoidectomy while maintaining the posterior and superior canal wall which reminds the reader of the Canal Wall Up Mastoidectomy. However, the difference is historical. Modified radical mastoidectomy typically refers to Bondy's procedure which involves treating disease affecting only the epitympanum. Diseased areas as well as portions of the adjacent superior and posterior canal are simply exteriorised without affecting the uninvolved middle ear. The structures are preserved to reconstruct hearing mechanism at the time of surgery or in second-stage operation.

In Radical and Modified Mastoidectomy the mastoid and middle ear cavities are exteriorized so as not to give the chance for the infection or the cholesteatoma to spread into the middle cranial fossa. Since the cavities are exteriorized, further inspection and cleaning could be done regularly.

Since the development of endoscopic transcanal ear surgery pioneered by Professor Tarabichi there has been a significant decrease in the use of this procedure.

References

Further reading 

 
 
 
 
 

Diseases of the ear and mastoid process
Ear surgery